Jan Larsen (born 16 November 1967) is a Danish butterfly and freestyle swimmer. He competed in three events at the 1988 Summer Olympics.

References

External links
 

1967 births
Living people
Danish male butterfly swimmers
Danish male freestyle swimmers
Olympic swimmers of Denmark
Swimmers at the 1988 Summer Olympics
People from Herning Municipality
Sportspeople from the Central Denmark Region